Characene (Ancient Greek: Χαρακηνή), also known as Mesene (Μεσσήνη) or Meshan, was a kingdom founded by the Iranian Hyspaosines located at the head of the Persian Gulf mostly within modern day Iraq. Its capital, Charax Spasinou (Χάραξ Σπασινού), was an important port for trade between Mesopotamia and India, and also provided port facilities for the city of Susa further up the Karun River. The kingdom was frequently a vassal of the Parthian Empire. Characene was mainly populated by Arabs, who spoke Aramaic as their cultural language. All rulers of the principality had Iranian names. Members of the Arsacid dynasty also ruled the state.

Name 
The name "Characene" originated from the name of the capital of the kingdom, Charax Spasinu. The kingdom was also known by the older name of the region, "Mesene", which is seemingly of Persian origin, meaning "land of buffalos" or the "land of sheep."

History
The capital of Characene, Alexandria, was originally founded by the Macedonian ruler Alexander the Great, with the intention of using the town as a leading commercial port for his eastern capital of Babylon. The region itself became the Satrapy of the Erythraean Sea. However, the city never lived up to its expectations, and was destroyed in the mid 3rd-century BC by floods. It was not until the reign of the Seleucid king Antiochus IV Epiphanes that the city was rebuilt and renamed Antiochia. After the city was fully restored in 166/5 BC, Antiochus IV appointed Hyspaosines as governor (eparch) of Antiochia and the Satrapy of the Erythraean Sea.

During this period Antiochia briefly flourished, until Antiochus IV's abrupt death in 163 BC, which weakened Seleucid authority throughout the empire. With the weakening of the Seleucids, many political entities within the empire declared independence, such as the neighbouring region of Characene, Elymais, which was situated in most of the present-day province of Khuzestan in southern Iran. Hyspaosines, although now a more or less independent ruler, remained a loyal subject of the Seleucids. Hyspaosines' keenness to remain as a Seleucid governor was possibly due to avoid interruption in the profitable trade between Antiochia and Seleucia.

The Seleucids had suffered heavy defeats by the Iranian Parthian Empire; in 148/7 BC, the Parthian king Mithridates I conquered Media and Atropatene, and by 141 BC, was in the possession of Babylonia. The menace and proximity of the Parthians caused Hyspaosines to declare independence. In 124 BC, however, Hyspaosines accepted Parthian suzerainty, and continued to rule Characene as a vassal. Characene would generally remain a semi-autonomous kingdom under Parthian suzerainty till its fall. The realm of the kingdom included the islands Failaka and Bahrain.

The kings of Characene are known mainly by their coins, consisting mainly of silver tetradrachms with Greek and later Aramaic inscriptions. These coins are dated after the Seleucid era, providing a secure framework for chronological succession.
 
In his Natural History, Pliny the Elder praises the port of Charax:

The embankments extend in length a distance of nearly 4½ kilometers, in breadth a little less. It stood at first at a distance of 1¾ km from the shore, and even had a harbor of its own. But according to Juba, it is 75 kilometer from the sea; and at the present day, the ambassadors from Arabia, and our own merchants who have visited the place, say that it stands at a distance of one 180 kilometers from the sea-shore. Indeed, in no part of the world have alluvial deposits been formed more rapidly by the rivers, and to a greater extent than here; and it is only a matter of surprise that the tides, which run to a considerable distance beyond this city, do not carry them back again.

Trade continued to be important. A famous Characenian, a man named Isidore, was the author of a treatise on Parthian trade routes, the Mansiones Parthicae. The inhabitants of Palmyra had a permanent trading station in Characene. Many inscriptions mention caravan trade.

Next to Charax, other important cities were Forat (at the Tigris), Apologos and Teredon. On his coins Meredates (ruled 131 to 150/151) calls himself king of the Omani. The latter are mentioned sporadically by ancient writers. According to Pliny (VI.145) they lived between Petra and Charax. They were according to some schola for a certain period part of the Charakene. So it seems that the kingdom extended to the South of the Persian Gulf. However, the reading and interpretation of the legends on the king's coins is problematic.

In AD 115 the Roman emperor Trajan conquered Mesopotamia as main part of his Parthian campaign. He also reached Characene, where he saw ships bound for India. According to Cassius Dio, Attambelos ruled there and was friendly to the emperor. Also the people of Charax Spasinu are described as friendly towards the emperor. The following two years, the Charakene remained most likely Roman, but emperor Hadrian decided to withdraw from Trajan's territorial gains. It remains uncertain whether the Charakene remained independent or whether it was placed under direct Parthian rule. The next Parthian king attested in ancient sources is Meredates, mentioned in an inscription at Palmyra datable to 131.

In 221–222 AD, an ethnic Persian, Ardashir V, who was King of Persis, led a revolt against the Parthians, establishing the Sasanian Empire. According to later Arab histories, he defeated Characene forces, killed its last ruler, rebuilt the town, and renamed it Astarābād-Ardašīr. The area around Charax that had been the Characene state was thereon known by the Aramaic name myšn, myšwn in the Babylonian Talmud (Baba Kamma 97b; Baba Bathra 73a; Shabbat 101a), or myšyn as attested in an Aramaic incantation bowl from Nippur, which was later adapted by the Arab conquerors as Maysān.

Charax continued, under the name Maysān, with Persian texts making various mention of governors throughout the fifth century. A Nestorian Church was mentioned there in the sixth century. The Charax mint appears to have continued throughout the Sassanid empire and into the Umayyad empire, minting coins as late as AD 715.

The earliest references from the first century A.D. indicates that the people of Characene were referred to as Μεσηνός and lived along the Arabian side of the coast at the head of the Persian Gulf.

Kings

Hyspaosines c. 127–124 BC
Apodakos c. 110/09–104/03 BC
Tiraios I 95/94–90/89 BC
possible usurper: Hippokrates Autokrator Nikephoros  81/80 BC
Tiraios II 79/78–49/48 BC
Artabazos I 49/48–48/47 BC
Attambelos I 47/46–25/24 BC
Theonesios I c. 19/18
Attambelos II c. 17/16 BC – AD 8/9
Abinergaos I 10/11; 22/23
Orabazes I c. 19
Attambelos III c. 37/38–44/45
Theonesios II c. 46/47
Theonesios III c. 52/53
Attambelos IV 54/55–64/65
Attambelos V 64/65–73/74
Orabazes II c. 73–80
Pakoros 80–101/02
Attambelos VI c. 101/02–105/06
Theonesios IV c. 110/11–112/113
Attambelos VII 113/14–117
Meredates c. 131–150/51
Orabazes II c. 150/51–165
Abinergaios II (?) c. 165–180
Attambelos VIII c. 180–195
Maga (?) c. 195–210
Abinergaos III c. 210–222

References

Sources

 .
 
 

 .

 
 

 
 
 

 
 

 

 
 .

Further reading
Gregoratti Leonardo, A Parthian port on the Persian Gulf: Characene and its Trade, "Anabasis, Studia Classica et Orientalia", 2, (2011), 209-229 
Schuol, Monika (2000) Die Charakene : ein mesopotamisches Königreich in hellenistisch-parthischer Zeit. Stuttgart: F. Steiner. 
Sheldon A. Nodelman, A Preliminary History of Charakene, Berytus 13 (1959/60), 83-121, XXVII f.,
Hansman, John (1991)  Characene and Charax Encyclopedia Iranica (print version Vol. V, Fasc. 4, pp. 363–365). Retrieved 25 April 2016.

 
Ancient history of Iraq
History of Kuwait
Sites along the Silk Road
Seleucid Empire successor states
120s BC establishments
Parthian Empire
222 disestablishments
States and territories disestablished in the 3rd century
States and territories established in the 2nd century BC